James Samuel Walraven (born 1949), known as the Bathtub Strangler, is an American murderer and suspected serial killer who murdered Gisele Clardy, and was the prime suspect in two similar murders of women in their apartments in Georgia in 1981. He was convicted and sentenced to die in the electric chair, which was later commuted to a life sentence.

Early life 
James Samuel Walraven was born in 1949. He was reported to have been a withdrawn, but well-behaved child, who developed emotional problems in his junior year of high school. His mother testified that his father was an alcoholic who abused his wife and children, leading them to divorce. In adulthood, Walraven was unemployed and frequented public tennis courts in Atlanta and DeKalb County. He had been committed to mental institutions numerous times and told doctors and strangers that he had felt inadequate with women. Walraven was arrested in June 1980 after pointing a gun at his tennis acquaintance, Jeff Campbell, who later described Walraven as a moody and unstable person.

Murders 
On April 15, 1981, police discovered 22-year-old Louise DalSanto strangled, lying face down in her bathtub at Woodcreek Apartments in Clarkston. On May 29, in Brookhaven, 22-year-old Giselle Clardy was found murdered in her bathtub at Cherry Hill Apartments, where she was an assistant manager. Both DalSanto and Clardy appeared to have been raped before their murders. Patricia Berry, also aged 22, was found dead in her bathtub on June 15, at Windermere Apartments in Fulton County, strangled with her own hair ribbon.

Investigation, trial and conviction 
Due to the similarities of the murders, law enforcement began investigating recent police reports for more possible information. One report from March 3 by Margaret Finnerty, another resident of Windermere Apartments, described a man entering her apartment under the guise of fixing pipes, and upon entering strangled her until she was unconscious. The apartment was ransacked, but only a World War II bayonet was stolen. Another report from March 16 by Constance Harold described a man dressed as a floral deliveryman outside her apartment. When she opened the door, he attempted to force his way in, though she managed to slam the door shut and notified police.

Law enforcement connected these two incidents to the murders, and developed a composite sketch of the suspect from the two women and other witnesses in the apartment complex. They later received a tip which led them to 32-year-old James Samuel Walraven, an unemployed man who frequented local tennis courts. On July 14, he was arrested and held in the DeKalb County Jail. During interrogation he told officers "the only person he had ever had sex with in his life was his sister".

His trial took place in November 1981. David Zorda, a forger who was incarcerated in the DeKalb County Jail at the time, testified that Walraven had told him that he "killed those goddamn bitches". A mechanic named James Buffington testified that he witnessed Walraven speaking briefly to Clardy in the parking lot of the apartment complex shortly before her murder. Additionally, Finnerty and Harold both identified Walraven as the man that had attacked them at their apartments in March. Walraven's defense attorney, Richard M. Loftis, contended that there were no fingerprints or other physical evidence to connect Walraven to the crimes. The DeKalb County jury returned its verdict of guilty on November 16, and Walraven was sentenced to death.

A motion was later filed, and due to the statement Walraven gave to Zorda not taking place in custodial interrogation, a retrial was scheduled and he was sentenced to life imprisonment in 1983. As of 2023, it's unclear whether he is still incarcerated or alive.

See also 
 List of serial killers in the United States

References 

1949 births
Living people
Suspected serial killers